Patriot Games is a 1992 American action thriller film directed by Phillip Noyce and based on Tom Clancy's 1987 novel of the same name. The film is a sequel to the 1990 film The Hunt for Red October, but with different actors in the leading roles, Harrison Ford starring as Jack Ryan and Anne Archer as his wife. James Earl Jones reprises his role as Admiral James Greer. The cast also includes Sean Bean, Patrick Bergin, Thora Birch, Samuel L. Jackson, James Fox, and Richard Harris.

The film premiered in theaters in the United States on June 5, 1992, and spent two weeks as the No. 1 film, grossing $178,051,587 worldwide at the box office. The film received a generally positive reception from critics, with controversies due to changes from the source material and the film's portrayal of the Northern Ireland conflict. During production Clancy also repeatedly voiced his displeasure with the adaptation. The following film in the series, Clear and Present Danger (1994), also starred Ford and Archer.

Plot
Former CIA analyst Jack Ryan now teaches history at the United States Naval Academy. In London with his physician wife, Cathy, and their young daughter Sally, Ryan witnesses and intervenes in a terrorist kidnapping attempt on Lord William Holmes, the British Minister of State for Northern Ireland and a cousin to the Queen. Ryan is wounded but disarms one terrorist and fatally shoots two others, then subdues Sean Miller. Among those killed is Miller's younger brother. All belong to a radical IRA splinter cell led by Kevin O'Donnell. Shortly after the incident, IRA operatives attempt and fail to assassinate O'Donnell, considering him and his followers too radical.

Miller is tried and convicted. As he is being transported to prison, O'Donnell and his comrades ambush the police convoy, killing the guards and freeing Miller. Fleeing to North Africa, O'Donnell plans the next attempt on Lord Holmes. Miller vows to avenge his brother's death, and O'Donnell allows him, O'Donnell's lover, Annette, and several others to travel to the US to assassinate Ryan. Meanwhile, British police have determined that an informant has been tipping off the terrorists and are surveilling a book shop owner who is an IRA operative.

Back in the United States, Ryan is informed about Miller's escape. Soon after, he narrowly survives an assassination attempt by Miller's accomplices, while Miller simultaneously targets Cathy while she drives home to Annapolis on the Chesapeake Bay Bridge, causing her car to crash into a highway divider, seriously injuring Sally, who has to have a splenectomy. Ryan's former CIA superior, Vice Admiral James Greer, asks Ryan to rejoin the agency to help capture the terrorists. While investigating, Ryan recalls glimpsing a red-headed woman during the attacks on him and Lord Holmes. Ryan approaches Sinn Fein representative Paddy O'Neil for information. O'Neil denies IRA involvement and denounces the attacks, but refuses to betray any fellow Irishmen. Ryan threatens to sabotage O'Neil's American fundraising efforts by showing images of his hospitalized daughter to the media. O'Neil eventually relents and identifies the red-haired female accomplice as an Englishwoman (Annette). Finding her will lead to Miller. Satellite analysis indicates that Miller and O'Donnell are at a terrorist training camp in Libya. The Special Air Service raid the camp, killing everyone, though Miller, O'Donnell, and their cohorts have already fled to North America to coincide with Lord Holmes's visit there.

While Lord Holmes is at the Ryan residence to present Ryan's KCVO medal, a severe thunderstorm apparently knocks out the house's power. Ryan notices the boat-house lights are still on, and he is unable to radio any DSS agents or state troopers guarding the premises. He deduces the house's power was deliberately cut and fears an imminent attack. Ryan realizes that Holmes' assistant, Watkins, is the informant and forces him to reveal information. Outside, O'Donnell, Miller, and their team have killed all security personnel, then infiltrate the house. After Ryan and his Naval Academy associate, Lt. Commander Robby Jackson, eliminate several terrorists, Ryan lures O'Donnell, Miller, and Annette into pursuing him on open water in their waiting speed boats. Upon realizing it is a ruse, O'Donnell demands they return and complete their mission to abduct and ransom Holmes. Miller, crazed with revenge against Ryan, refuses, then fatally shoots O'Donnell and Annette. He leaps aboard Ryan's boat where a struggle ensues; Ryan kills Miller and jumps overboard just before the burning boat crashes into jutting rocks and explodes. An FBI Hostage Rescue Team arrives, rescuing Ryan.

Cast

Production

Development and casting
Viacom tried to option the rights for an ABC television adaptation of Patriot Games after the release of the novel in 1987. However, Tom Clancy got into a legal dispute over whether he had retained the character in his deal for the U.S. Naval Institute to publish the previous novel in the series The Hunt for Red October. In 1988, during the pre-production of the film adaptation of The Hunt for Red October, Paramount Pictures issued another lawsuit claiming that it had purchased the rights to the character of Jack Ryan with its $455,000 contract to adapt The Hunt for Red October and that the ABC adaptation could not move forward. Although Tom Clancy’s attorney Robert Yodelman disputed Paramount’s claim to full character rights, the lawsuit led to the project’s cancellation. After the release of The Hunt for Red October, Paramount Pictures paid $2.5 million for the rights to Patriot Games and Clear and Present Danger.

The actors who played Jack and Caroline Ryan in The Hunt for Red October, Alec Baldwin and Gates McFadden, did not appear in the film. Baldwin was in negotiations to reprise his role, but committed to perform in A Streetcar Named Desire on Broadway after filming on Patriot Games was delayed by two months. In 2011, Baldwin claimed the role was recast due to David Kirkpatrick forcing him to choose between performing in A Streetcar Named Desire or agreeing to an open-ended clause relating to dates for the first sequel. Baldwin further claimed this occurred after a famous actor, widely believed to be the film's eventual star Harrison Ford, offered to play Ryan. Ford was favored by both the studio and the director John McTiernan due to a large debt the studio owed to him from Harold Becker's unproduced historical film Night Ride Down, a film about the Pullman strike which was cancelled due to the early 1990's recession. McTiernan had originally desired Ford in the role in the first film and confirmed that  "there was a great deal of scheming that went on to push Alec out of that part." Kirkpatrick responded to Baldwin's claims by saying that negotiations with him to reprise the role had already broken due to his insistence on script approval. Ford signed a $9 million three-picture contract to play Ryan after Baldwin's departure.

McTiernan initially wanted to follow The Hunt for Red October by directing an adaptation of Clear and Present Danger using a script written by John Milius. After the studio opted to adapt Patriot Games, he declined to direct because of his Irish-American background. Walter Hill, Kevin Reynolds, and John Badham were considered to replace McTiernan. Badham was almost hired but asked for too high of a fee, and Phillip Noyce was chosen instead. Donald Stewart returned from the first film to co-write the script with W. Peter Iliff.

In the original novel, the assassination attempt was made on the Prince of Wales and many members of the British royal family appeared as important characters. They were replaced with fictitious characters in the screenplay, with Prince Charles being replaced by Lord Holmes, a nonexistent cousin of Queen Elizabeth The Queen Mother.

Filming
Shooting began on November 2, 1991. The budget was initially $28 million, but was raised to $40 million by Brandon Tartikoff. The movie was filmed on location in areas around London, at Royal Naval College, Greenwich, and at Pinewood Studios. Scenes were also filmed at the U.S. Naval Academy in Annapolis, Maryland. Jack Ryan's home was filmed on the California coast and made to look like it was in Maryland.

The scenes set at a terrorist camp in Libya were filmed in the desert near Brawley, California. To make the attack on the camp appear as infrared footage, actors wearing black body suits were filmed from a helicopter and the resulting video images were reversed in post-production.

Patriot Games was the first movie to be allowed to film at the George Bush Center for Intelligence, CIA Headquarters.

Filming also took place at Aldwych underground station for a sequence later in the film. Harrison Ford accidentally hit Sean Bean with a boat hook while shooting the final scene; Bean has a scar over his eye as a result.

Test audiences in April 1992 responded negatively to the original ending, which had Jack Ryan and Sean Miller fighting underwater. The ending was re-shot with a more explosive finale. The reshoots and marketing caused the film's budget to expand to $65 million.

The numerous changes between the film and the novel caused Clancy to distance himself from the film production. Clancy was unhappy with the script and Ford's portrayal of Ryan. During production asked for his name to be taken off the film. He complained that the final attack scene was "unrealistic" and that he had not been shown any rushes. He said he was not sure a film would be made of Clear and Present Danger "because I think Patriot Games will turn out so bad." However, Tartikoff later met Clancy to show him a rough cut of the film, and assuaged his concerns enough to guarantee that he would work with the studio again.

Music

On June 9, 1992, the original motion picture soundtrack was released by the RCA Records music label. The film's musical score was composed by James Horner and contains musical references to works by Aram Khachaturian (Adagio from "Gayane" Suite) and Dmitri Shostakovich (Symphony No. 5, 3rd mvt.). A music video is shown in an early scene featuring Clannad's song "Theme from Harry's Game", originally made for an ITV drama about The Troubles in 1982.  All other vocal performances featured on the soundtrack were performed by Maggie Boyle.

In 2013, a 2-disc expanded soundtrack album was released by La-La Land Records. Limited to 3000 copies, the album contains over 50 minutes of previously unreleased music (including cues by Wolfgang Amadeus Mozart and John Philip Sousa).

Reception

Critical reception

Despite receiving generally positive reviews, the film garnered controversy during its release, from Tom Clancy disowning the film, to critics complaining it was too different from the book. Nonetheless the film has earned a 74% "Fresh" rating on Rotten Tomatoes based on 42 reviews. The site's consensus states: "Patriot Games doesn't win many points for verisimilitude, but some entertaining set pieces -- and Harrison Ford in the central role -- more than compensate for its flaws." Metacritic calculated an average score of 64 out of 100 based on 23 reviews, indicating "generally favorable reviews". Audiences polled by CinemaScore gave the film an average grade of "A-" on an A+ to F scale.

Roger Ebert called it "absorbing" while also commenting that Harrison Ford "once again demonstrates what a solid, convincing actor he is". Chris Hicks of the Deseret News mentioned how director Noyce gave the film "flourish and tension" while star Harrison Ford injected "a commanding sense of decency and humanity to the role of CIA analyst Jack Ryan, making it his own."

Box office
The film was a financial success, debuting at the number one position for the weekend of June 5, 1992. During that weekend, the film grossed $18,511,191 in business showing at 2,365 locations. The film's revenue dropped by 39.5% in its second week of release, earning $11,208,134. For that particular weekend, the film remained in 1st place with an increased theater count of 2,396. Patriot Games went on to top out domestically at $83,351,587 in ticket sales and $94,700,000 in foreign business for a worldwide total of $178,051,587 through an initial 9-week theatrical run. For 1992 as a whole, the film would cumulatively rank at a box office performance position of 14.

References

External links

 
 
 
 
 
 
 

1990s English-language films
1990s American films
1992 films
1992 action thriller films
1990s political thriller films
1990s spy thriller films
American action thriller films
American films about revenge
American political thriller films
American sequel films
American spy thriller films
Films about assassinations
Films about murderers
Films about terrorism in Europe
Films about the Irish Republican Army
Films about The Troubles (Northern Ireland)
Films based on American novels
Films based on military novels
Films based on works by Tom Clancy
Films directed by Phillip Noyce
Films produced by Mace Neufeld
Films scored by James Horner
Films set in Libya
Films set in London
Films set in Maryland
Films set in Northern Ireland
Films shot at Pinewood Studios
Films shot in Maryland
Films shot in Washington, D.C.
Home invasions in film
Paramount Pictures films
Ryanverse films
Films shot in Virginia
Films set in Langley, Virginia
Films shot in London
Films shot in California